Piano Solo Vol. 1 is a live solo piano album by Irène Schweizer. It was recorded at Alte Kirche Boswil in Switzerland in May 1990, and was released in 1992 by Intakt Records.

Reception

In a review for AllMusic, Joslyn Layne wrote: "Piano Solo Vol. 1 offers a wide cross-section of the many modes of impressive improviser and pianist Irene Schweizer. It moves almost without pause through various forms and moods... With well-timed moments of suspense and humor, this album is a great listen and a good sampling of what Schweizer does."

The authors of the Penguin Guide to Jazz Recordings awarded the album 4 stars, and stated: "Brief and apparently inconsequential structures are delivered without elaboration and there is a meditative stillness to much of the music. "The Ballad Of The Sad Cafè"... is a masterpiece of unsentimental expression, played with an affecting combination of gentleness and ironclad certainty... [The record is] faithfully and accurately registered, picking up Schweizer's softest figures and sustains, and handling the loudest and most impactful moments without distortion."

Track listing
All compositions by Irène Schweizer.

 "Verschoben" – 5:33
 "Irritations & Variations" – 5:11
 "The Ballad Of The Sad Cafè" – 4:06
 "Wo Ist Mein Hund?" – 2:32
 "Backlash" – 3:33
 "Stomping At The Church" – 4:47
 "Melancholy Single Blues" – 4:06
 "Look-In" – 1:45
 "Look-Out" – 3:27
 "Polka, Dots & Stringbeans" – 2:48
 "Wieso?" – 1:38
 "Broken Notes" – 3:26
 "Endlich!" – 3:46
 "Talking Frog" – 5:02
 "Blauer Mazurka" – 3:04

Personnel 
 Irène Schweizer – piano

References

1992 live albums
Intakt Records live albums
Irène Schweizer live albums